Johnny Apollo is a 1940 American film noir crime film directed by Henry Hathaway and starring Tyrone Power and Dorothy Lamour.

Plot
Bob Cain, Jr.'s stockbroker father, "Pop" Cain, is sentenced to prison for embezzlement of funds. Up until this time, the two were close, but Bob falls out with Pop over this situation and quits college to look for a job. He is unable to find one due to his father's notoriety. He finds work when he decides to use an alias, but is fired when this is discovered.

Later, gangster Mickey Dwyer, sentenced on  the same day as Pop, is granted parole. Bob, disgusted with his father's lawyer, goes to see Dwyer's attorney, an old former judge named Emmett T. Brennan. Waiting outside Brennan's apartment, Bob, calling himself Johnny, meets the gangster's girlfriend, Lucky Dubarry. They chat and she is immediately attracted to him. Brennan arrives. Lucky pretends she knows Bob, and he, not wanting to disclose his identify at all, when asked by Brennan tells them both his full name is Johnny Apollo (taking the surname from the neon sign marquee visible through the window on the dance-club across the street). Lucky leaves, and Bob inquires of Brennan how to get Pop paroled. With money, he is told.

Dwyer arrives and asks about Johnny. Brennan 'vouches' for him. Dwyer, not wanting to be anywhere near police, asks Bob to go bail out one of his crew, offering a hundred dollars to Bob. Bob accepts the task.

Soon, Dwyer offers Apollo employment.  Apollo decides to work for the gangster to raise the dough he needs. They commit various criminal acts (not shown). After accumulating much money, Bob visits his father in prison. They reconcile, and Bob talks of a forthcoming parole, so Pop is happy. But after he leaves, his father discovers from a guard that his son, 'Johnny Apollo', is now a criminal, and a disgusted Pop Cain wants nothing to do with him.

Brennan attempts to make a deal for Dwyer, offering the district attorney evidence on all of his crew, if all pending charges against Dwyer are dropped. The D.A. does not accept, but counteroffers: he will drop all pending charges against Apollo, in exchange for evidence on Dwyer. Brennan accepts, knowing Apollo is essentially a good man, and that Lucky is in love with him. He hands over damning evidence on Dwyer.

In retaliation, Dwyer murders Brennan. Bob, unaware and not believing Dwyer could murder the judge, with whom he was good friends, alibis Dwyer. Both he and Dwyer are sent to prison, using Brennan's evidence, the D.A. ignoring the deal he had with Brennan, due to Bob's recalcitrant attitude. A jailbreak is set in motion, but Lucky is able to sneak word of it to Pop, who prevents his son from getting involved. An angry Dwyer shoots Pop and knocks out Bob, but is then killed by guards.

Bob is blamed and faces a longer sentence, perhaps even execution. Pop recovers, however, and alibis his son. Bob's future looks brighter, particularly with Lucky on the outside, waiting for him.

Cast

 Tyrone Power as Bob Cain
 Dorothy Lamour as 'Lucky' Dubarry
 Edward Arnold as Robert Cain Sr. 
 Lloyd Nolan as Mickey Dwyer
 Charley Grapewin as Judge Emmett T. Brennan
 Lionel Atwill as Jim McLaughlin
 Marc Lawrence as Bates
 Jonathan Hale as Dr. Brown
 Harry Rosenthal as Piano Player
 Russell Hicks as District Attorney
 Fuzzy Knight as Cellmate
 Charles Lane as Assistant District Attorney
 Selmer Jackson as Warden (as Selmar Jackson)
 Charles Trowbridge as Judge
 John Hamilton as Judge
 William Pawley as Paul
 Eric Wilton as Butler
 Gary Breckner as Announcer 
 Harry Tyler as Trusty
 George Irving as Mr. Ives
 Eddie Marr as Harry - Henchman
 Anthony Caruso as Joe - Henchman
 Stanley Andrews as Welfare Secretary
 Wally Albright as Office Boy

Production
Lamour sings (no voice-overs) several songs in the film, including the 1938 hit song "They Say" by Edward Heyman, Paul Mann and Stephen Weiss. Miss Lamour also dances in nightclub scenes.

Quotes
"I'm leaving town".
"Where to?".
"As far as 20 bucks and a mink coat will take me".

External links
 
 
 

1940 films
Films directed by Henry Hathaway
American black-and-white films
American crime drama films
1940 romantic drama films
20th Century Fox films
1940 crime drama films
American romantic drama films
Films with screenplays by Philip Dunne
1940s English-language films
1940s American films